Kelton Pell is an Aboriginal Australian (Noongar) stage, TV and film actor, best known for his role as the court liaison officer, Sam Wallan, in the SBS legal drama The Circuit set in north-western Australia. Pell is from Western Australia.

Career
Pell has been a stage presence in the theatre since 1985, performing for the Yirra Yaakin Noongar Theatre, the Black Swan Theatre Company and the Sydney Theatre Company. Many of these performances were of plays which grew from Indigenous themes.

In 2000 Pell, along with Ningali Lawford and Phil Thomson, wrote a show for the Yirra Yaakin Noongar Theatre called Solid, whose premiere performance was at the Perth International Arts Festival. Because of its sensitive Indigenous subject matter, before the premiere the play was performed for, and to the approval of, 2000 Indigenous Australians.

Pell performed in several productions of Bloodland, a play directed by the Stephen Page with a Romeo and Juliet-type of story. The play features traditional Aboriginal languages and Pidgin English, as well as song and dance.

He has also acted in performances of Twelfth Night and A Midsummer Night's Dream.

Pell is a familiar face on Australian television, having been seen in the young TV show The Adventures of the Bush Patrol and the SBS series, The Circuit, a legal drama set in the Kimberley. In 2012 he starred in an episode of the highly regarded TV series, Redfern Now, as a well-to-do Aboriginal Australian man living in Redfern, Sydney, whose life seems to be exemplary, though he has been receiving government benefit money fraudulently.

Filmography

Film

Television

Awards
Pell has won the following awards:
 In 1991 WA Aboriginal Artist of the Year Award.
 In 1994 Swan Gold Award for Best West Australian Actor.
 In 1996 Contemporary Performing Arts Award for Best Collaboration.
 In 2019 he was also recognised for his outstanding contribution to the Australian film industry and named the CinefestOZ 2019 Screen Legend.

References

External links
 

Year of birth missing (living people)
Living people
20th-century Australian male actors
21st-century Australian male actors
Australian male film actors
Australian male stage actors
Australian male television actors
Indigenous Australian male actors
Indigenous Australians from Western Australia